Georgios Mallios (born 25 May 1965) is a retired Greek football defender.

References

1965 births
Living people
Greek footballers
Doxa Drama F.C. players
Iraklis Thessaloniki F.C. players
Kavala F.C. players
Association football defenders
Super League Greece players